Brandon Michael Bielak (born April 2, 1996) is an American professional baseball pitcher for the Houston Astros of Major League Baseball (MLB). He played college baseball at the University of Notre Dame. He was selected by the Astros in the 11th round of the 2017 MLB draft, and made his MLB debut in 2020.

Amateur career
Raised in Sayreville, New Jersey, Bielak attended and played baseball at St. Joseph High School in Metuchen, New Jersey. In 2014, as a senior, he pitched to an 8–1 record with a 0.58 ERA, striking out 87 batters in 60.2 innings pitched. 

Undrafted out of high school in the 2014 MLB draft, he enrolled at the University of Notre Dame where he played college baseball for the Fighting Irish. In 2015, as a freshman, he was 6–3 with a 3.55 ERA in 17 games (14 starts), in 2016, as a sophomore, he compiled a 3–2 record and a 2.10 ERA in 15 games (four starts). Following his sophomore season, he played collegiate summer baseball with the Orleans Firebirds of the Cape Cod Baseball League, and was named a league all-star. In 2017, as a junior, he was 2–6 with a 5.55 ERA in 15 games (14 starts).  After his junior year, he was selected by the Houston Astros in the 11th round of the 2017 MLB draft.

Professional career
Bielak signed with Houston and made his professional debut with the Gulf Coast League Astros. After two scoreless appearances, he was promoted to the Tri-City ValleyCats where he finished the season with a 1–1 record and a 0.92 ERA in eight games (four starts). In 2018, Bielak began the season with the Buies Creek Astros and was named a Carolina League All-Star; he was promoted to the Corpus Christi Hooks in June. In 25 games (17 starts) between the two clubs, he went 7–8 with a 2.23 ERA and a 1.15 WHIP. In 2019, Bielak returned to Corpus Christi to begin the season and was promoted to the Round Rock Express in May. Over 23 games (twenty starts), Bielak went 11–4 with a 4.22 ERA, striking out 119 over  innings.

On July 27, 2020, Bielak's contract was selected to the 40-man roster. He made his MLB debut that day against the Seattle Mariners and was the winning pitcher in an 8–5 contest. Bielak finished the 2020 season with Houston with a 6.75 ERA over 32 innings.

In 2021, Bielak went 3-4 while appearing in 28 games (two starts). He pitched fifty innings and struck out 46 batters while walking 21; he had a WHIP of 1.380 and an ERA of 4.50.

References

External links

1996 births
Living people
Baseball players from New Jersey
Buies Creek Astros players
Corpus Christi Hooks players
Gulf Coast Astros players
Houston Astros players
Major League Baseball pitchers
Notre Dame Fighting Irish baseball players
Orleans Firebirds players
People from Edison, New Jersey
People from Sayreville, New Jersey
Round Rock Express players
Sportspeople from Middlesex County, New Jersey
St. Joseph High School (Metuchen, New Jersey) alumni
Sugar Land Skeeters players
Tri-City ValleyCats players
Sugar Land Space Cowboys players